"Wach auf!" (German for Wake up!) is the first single from German industrial metal group Oomph!'s tenth album Monster. The song appeared in the German version of the film, Aliens vs. Predator: Requiem.

Music video
The music video premiered on 14 December 2007, and contains clips from Aliens vs. Predator: Requiem interspersed with scenes featuring the band playing.

Track listing 
 Wach auf!  ("Wake up!") - 3:20
 Wach auf! (Transporterraum Remix) - 4:49

References

Oomph! songs
2008 songs
2008 singles
Song articles with missing songwriters
Songs written for films
Alien vs. Predator (franchise) mass media